Utami Dewi Kinard (born 16 June 1951) is a former world-class badminton player who was considered Indonesia's #1 women's singles player in the 1970s, and became the United States' #1 player in 1981, after marrying former 6 time U.S. men's singles champion, Chris Kinard. She is also the sister of 8 time All-England singles champion, Rudy Hartono.

Early life 
Utami Dewi was born in Surabaya in 1951. She is the sister of 8 time All England singles champion, Rudy Hartono. She initially pursued running, and in the 1967 PASI championship at the Senayan Jakarta, Dewi won the women's 800 meter running event. She graduated from the Vocational Education Institute of Tarakanita in 1974.

Career 
Utami Dewi was the number 1 Indonesian women's singles player from 1971 to 1975. She played singles for the Indonesian Uber Cup teams of 1969, 1972, and 1975 (competitions then held every 3 years). The 1975 team was Indonesia's first to win the Women's World Team Championship. She was the second Indonesian player to reached the women's singles semi finals at the All England Open in 1975. As Mrs. Utami Kinard she ended her career as the #1 U.S. women's singles player in 1981 representing the U.S. as the #1 player on the 1981 U.S. Uber Cup team.

Along with her Indonesian and U.S. titles, Utami Dewi won the Asian singles championship in 1971, the Australian Open singles champion in 1975, the Mexican Open women's singles and mixed doubles Champion in 1979, and the South African singles champion in 1980.

Additional badminton career highlights 
1972 - Munich Olympics - Won the Silver medal in badminton women's singles (badminton was a demonstration sport).

1975 - All-England Badminton Championship -Reached the semi-finals of the women's singles.

Represented either Indonesia, or the U.S., or both internationally in the following countries: Australia, Canada, Denmark, England, Germany, Hong Kong, Japan, Mexico, New Zealand, Peru, Scotland, Singapore, South Africa, South Korea, Sweden, Taiwan, Thailand.

Awards in badminton 
In 1981, she was in Sports Illustrated's "Faces in the Crowd".

Achievements

Olympic Games (demonstration) 

Women's singles

Mixed doubles

Asian Championships 

Women's singles

International Open Tournaments 

Women's singles

Other tournaments

References 

1951 births
Living people
Sportspeople from Surabaya
Indonesian people of Chinese descent
Indonesian female badminton players
Badminton players at the 1972 Summer Olympics
Badminton players at the 1970 Asian Games
Asian Games bronze medalists for Indonesia
Asian Games medalists in badminton
Medalists at the 1970 Asian Games
Indonesian emigrants to the United States
American female badminton players
21st-century American women